Oval is a London Underground station in the London Borough of Lambeth. It is on the Northern line between Kennington and Stockwell stations and is in Travelcard Zone 2. It opened on 18 December 1890 as part of the City and South London Railway and is named after The Oval cricket ground, which it serves.

Location
The station is located at the junction of Kennington Park Road (heading north-east), Camberwell New Road (south-east), Clapham Road (south west) and Harleyford Street (north west) and is about 500 yards from The Oval cricket ground. Also close by are Kennington Park and the imposing St Mark's Church.

History

The City and South London Railway opened to passengers between Stockwell and King William Street on 18 December 1890, and was both the first standard gauge tube and the first railway to employ electric traction in London. To avoid disturbance of surface buildings the construction of the tube was shield-driven at deep level, and much of the work was done via shafts at station sites which later contained the passenger lifts.

Oval tube station was the intended site of one of the attempted London bombings on 21 July 2005.

Station building

The Oval station, opened as Kennington Oval, was designed by Thomas Phillips Figgis with elements of early Arts and Crafts and neo-classical detailing. The structure was made distinctive by a lead-covered dome with cupola lantern and weathervane which housed some of the lift equipment; the main part of the building was of red brick. The station building was rebuilt in the early 1920s when the line was modernised and was refurbished during late 1997/early 1998 at street level with a modern tiling scheme inside and out, adding a full-length glazed canopy and giving the station a more modern look. Reflecting its proximity to the cricket ground, the internal decorative tiling features large images of cricketers in various stances.

In 2004 station staff started to use a whiteboard to display a handwritten "thought of the day" from the Tao Te Ching for the benefit of passengers. This idea then spread to other Underground stations such as North Greenwich, where the content relates to events at the nearby O2 Arena.

Services and connections
Train frequencies vary throughout the day, but generally operate every 3–6 minutes between 06:03 and 00:27 in both directions.

London Bus routes 3, 36, 59, 133, 155, 159, 185, 333, 415 and 436 and night routes N3, N109, N133, N136 and N155  serve the station.

In popular culture
The station was mocked up by the television series Survivors: The Lights of London parts 1 & 2, broadcast on  BBC One on 14 and 21 April 1976. However, the filmed site was actually at Camden Town deep-level shelter.

Gallery

References

Sources

External links

 London Transport Museum Photographic Archive

Northern line stations
Tube stations in the London Borough of Lambeth
Former City and South London Railway stations
Railway stations in Great Britain opened in 1890
Kennington
London Underground Night Tube stations
1890 establishments in England